The following outline is provided as an overview of and topical guide to medicine:

Medicine – science of healing. It encompasses a variety of health care practices evolved to maintain health by the prevention and treatment of illness.

Aims
 Cure
 Health
 Homeostasis
Medical ethics
 Prevention of illness
Palliation

Branches of medicine 

Anesthesiology – practice of medicine dedicated to the relief of pain and total care of the surgical patient before, during and after surgery.
Cardiology – branch of medicine that deals with disorders of the heart and the blood vessels.
Critical care medicine – focuses on life support and the intensive care of the seriously ill.
Dentistry – branch of medicine that deals with treatment of diseases in the oral cavity
Dermatology – branch of medicine that deals with the skin, hair, and nails.
Emergency medicine – focuses on care provided in the emergency department
Endocrinology – branch of medicine that deals with disorders of the endocrine system.
Epidemiology – study of cause and prevalence of diseases and programs to contain them
First aid – assistance given to any person experiencing a sudden illness or injury, with care provided to preserve life, prevent the condition from worsening, and/or promote recovery. It includes initial intervention in a serious condition prior to professional medical help being available, such as performing CPR while awaiting an ambulance, as well as the complete treatment of minor conditions, such as applying a plaster to a cut.
Gastroenterology – branch of medicine that deals with the study and care of the digestive system.
General practice (often called family medicine) is a branch of medicine that specializes in primary care.
Geriatrics – branch of medicine that deals with the general health and well-being of the elderly.
Gynaecology – diagnosis and treatment of the female reproductive system
Hematology – branch of medicine that deals with the blood and the circulatory system.
Hepatology – branch of medicine that deals with the liver, gallbladder and the biliary system.
Infectious disease – branch of medicine that deals with the diagnosis and management of infectious disease, especially for complex cases and immunocompromised patients.
Internal medicine – involved with adult diseases
Neurology – branch of medicine that deals with the brain and the nervous system.
Nephrology – branch of medicine which deals with the kidneys.
Obstetrics – care of women during and after pregnancy
Occupational medicine – branch of medicine concerned with the maintenance of health in the workplace
Oncology – branch of medicine that studies the types of cancer.
Ophthalmology – branch of medicine that deals with the eyes.
Optometry – branch of medicine that involves examining the eyes and applicable visual systems for defects or abnormalities as well as the medical diagnosis and management of eye disease.
Orthopaedics – branch of medicine that deals with conditions involving the musculoskeletal system.
Otorhinolaryngology – branch of medicine that deals with the ears, nose and throat.
Pathology – study of causes and pathogenesis of diseases.
Pediatrics – branch of medicine that deals with the general health and well-being of children and in some countries like the U.S. young adults.
Preventive medicine – measures taken for disease prevention, as opposed to disease treatment.
Psychiatry – branch of medicine that deals with the study, diagnosis, treatment, and prevention of mental disorders.
Pulmonology – branch of medicine that deals with the respiratory system.
Radiology – branch of medicine that employs medical imaging to diagnose and treat disease.
Sports medicine – branch of medicine that deals with physical fitness and the treatment and prevention of injuries related to sports and exercise.
Rheumatology – branch of medicine that deals with the diagnosis and treatment of rheumatic diseases.
Surgery – branch of medicine that uses operative techniques to investigate or treat both disease and injury, or to help improve bodily function or appearance.
Urology – branch of medicine that deals with the urinary system of both sexes and the male reproductive system
 History of medicine
Prehistoric medicine
Homeopathy
Herbalism
Siddha medicine
Ayurveda
Ancient Egyptian medicine
Babylonian medicine
Ancient Iranian medicine
Traditional Chinese medicine
Jewish medicine
Greco-Roman medicine
Medicine in the medieval Islamic world
Medieval medicine of Western Europe

Medical biology 
Medical biology

Fields of medical biology 
 Anatomy – study of the physical structure of organisms. In contrast to macroscopic or gross anatomy, cytology and histology are concerned with microscopic structures.
 List of anatomical topics
 List of bones of the human skeleton
 List of homologues of the human reproductive system
 List of human anatomical features
 List of human anatomical parts named after people
 List of human blood components
 List of human hormones
 List of human nerves
 List of muscles of the human body
 List of regions in the human brain
 Biochemistry – study of the chemistry taking place in living organisms, especially the structure and function of their chemical components.
 Bioinformatics
 Biological engineering
 Biophysics
 Biostatistics – application of statistics to biological fields in the broadest sense. A knowledge of biostatistics is essential in the planning, evaluation, and interpretation of medical research. It is also fundamental to epidemiology and evidence-based medicine.
 Biotechnology
 Nanobiotechnology
 Cell biology – microscopic study of individual cells.
 Embryology – study of the early development of organisms.
 Gene therapy
 Genetics – study of genes, and their role in biological inheritance.
 Cytogenetics
 Histology – study of the structures of biological tissues by light microscopy, electron microscopy and immunohistochemistry.
 Immunology – study of the immune system, which includes the innate and adaptive immune system in humans, for example. 
 Laboratory medical biology
 Microbiology – study of microorganisms, including protozoa, bacteria, fungi, and viruses.
 Molecular biology
 Neuroscience   (outline) – includes those disciplines of science that are related to the study of the nervous system. A main focus of neuroscience is the biology and physiology of the human brain and spinal cord.
 Parasitology
 Pathology – study of disease, including the causes, course, progression and resolution thereof.
 Physiology – study of the normal functioning of the body and the underlying regulatory mechanisms.
 Systems biology
 Virology
 Toxicology – study of hazardous effects of drugs and poisons.
 and many others (typically, life sciences that pertain to medicine)

Illness (diseases and disorders) 

 List of cancer types
 List of childhood diseases
 List of diseases caused by insects
 List of eponymous diseases
 List of fictional diseases
 List of food-borne illness outbreaks in the United States
 List of genetic disorders
 List of human parasitic diseases
 List of illnesses related to poor nutrition
 List of infectious diseases
 List of infectious diseases causing flu-like syndrome
 List of latent human viral infections
 List of mental illnesses
 List of neurological disorders
 List of notifiable diseases
 List of parasites (human)
 List of skin-related conditions
 List of systemic diseases with ocular manifestations

Medical practice 
Practice of medicine
Physical examination
Diagnosis
Surgery
Medication

Drugs 
Drugs
 List of anaesthetic drugs
 List of antibiotics
 List of antiviral drugs
 List of bestselling drugs
 List of drugs affected by grapefruit
 List of drugs banned from the Olympics
 List of controlled drugs in the United Kingdom
 List of medical inhalants
 List of monoclonal antibodies
 List of psychedelic drugs
 List of psychiatric medications
 List of psychiatric medications by condition treated
 List of schedules of controlled substances (USA)
List of Schedule I drugs
 List of Schedule II drugs
 List of Schedule III drugs
 List of Schedule IV drugs
 List of Schedule V drugs
 List of withdrawn drugs

Medical equipment 
Medical equipment
MRI
Computed axial tomography

Medical labs
Blood test

Medical facilities 
 Clinic
 Hospice
 List of hospice programs
 Hospital
 List of hospitals in the United States
 List of burn centers in the United States
 List of Veterans Affairs medical facilities

Medical education 
Medical education – education related to the practice of being a medical practitioner; either the initial training to become a physician, additional training thereafter, and fellowship.
 Medical school
 List of medical schools
 Internship
 Residency
 Fellowship

Medical research 
Medical research
 Clinical research   (outline)

Medical jargon 
Medical terminology
 List of medical roots, suffixes and prefixes

Medical abbreviations and acronyms 
 Acronyms in healthcare
 List of medical abbreviations: Overview
 List of medical abbreviations: Latin abbreviations
 List of abbreviations for diseases and disorders
 List of abbreviations for medical organisations and personnel
 List of abbreviations used in medical prescriptions
 List of abbreviations used in health informatics
 List of optometric abbreviations

Medical glossaries 
 Glossary of alternative medicine
 Glossary of anatomical terminology, definitions and abbreviations
 Glossary of clinical research
 Glossary of communication disorders
 Glossary of diabetes
 Glossary of medical terms related to communications disorders
 Glossary of medicine
 Glossary of psychiatry

Medical organizations 
 List of medical organisations
 List of LGBT medical organizations
 List of pharmacy associations

Government agencies 
 Centers for Disease Control and Prevention (US)
 Food and Drug Administration (US)
 National Academy of Medicine (US)
 National Institutes of Health (US)

Medical publications 
 List of important publications in medicine
 List of medical journals
 List of defunct medical journals
 List of medical and health informatics journals

Persons influential in medicine 
 List of physicians

Medical scholars 

The earliest known physician, Hesyre.
The first recorded female physician, Peseshet.
Borsippa, a Babylonian who wrote the Diagnostic Handbook.
The Iranian chemist, Rhazes.
Avicenna, the philosopher and physician.
Greco-Roman medical scholars:
Hippocrates, commonly considered the father of modern medicine.
Galen, known for his ambitious surgeries.
Andreas Vesalius
Oribasius, a Byzantine who compiled medical knowledge.
Abu al-Qasim, an Islamic physician known as the father of modern surgery.
Medieval European medical scholars:
Theodoric Borgognoni, one of the most significant surgeons of the medieval period, responsible for introducing and promoting important surgical advances including basic antiseptic practice and the use of anaesthetics.
Guy de Chauliac, considered to be one of the earliest fathers of modern surgery, after the great Islamic surgeon, Abu al-Qasim.
Realdo Colombo, anatomist and surgeon who contributed to understanding of lesser circulation.
Michael Servetus, considered to be the first European to discover the pulmonary circulation of the blood.
Ambroise Paré suggested using ligatures instead of cauterisation and tested the bezoar stone.
William Harvey describes blood circulation.
John Hunter, surgeon.
Amato Lusitano described venous valves and guessed their function.
Garcia de Orta first to describe Cholera and other tropical diseases and herbal treatments
Percivall Pott, surgeon.
Sir Thomas Browne physician and medical neologist.
Thomas Sydenham physician and so-called "English Hippocrates."
Kuan Huang, who studied abroad and brought his techniques back to homeland china.
Ignaz Semmelweis, who studied and decreased the incidence of childbed fever.
Louis Pasteur and Robert Koch founded bacteriology.
Alexander Fleming, whose accidental discovery of penicillin advanced the field of antibiotics.

Pioneers in medicine 
Wilhelm Röntgen discovered x-rays, earning the first Nobel Prize in Physics in 1901, "in recognition of the extraordinary services he has rendered by the discovery of the remarkable rays (or x-rays)," and invented radiography.
Christiaan Barnard performed the first heart transplant
Ian Donald pioneered the use of the ultrasound scan, which led to its use as a diagnostic tool.
Sir Godfrey Hounsfield invented the computed tomography (CT) scanner, sharing the 1979 Nobel Prize in Physiology or Medicine with Allan M. Cormack, "for the development of computer assisted tomography."
Sir Peter Mansfield invented the MRI scanner, sharing the 2003 Nobel Prize in Physiology or Medicine with Paul Lauterbur for their "discoveries concerning magnetic resonance imaging."
Robert Jarvik, inventor of the artificial heart.
Anthony Atala, creator of the first lab-grown organ, an artificial urinary bladder.

General concepts in medicine 
 Epidemiology – study of the demographics of disease processes, and includes, but is not limited to, the study of epidemics.
 Nutrition – study of the relationship of food and drink to health and disease, especially in determining an optimal diet. Medical nutrition therapy is done by dietitians and is prescribed for diabetes, cardiovascular diseases, weight and eating disorders, allergies, malnutrition, and neoplastic diseases.
 Pharmacology – study of drugs and their actions.
 Psychology – an academic and applied discipline that involves the scientific study of mental functions and behaviors.
 Outline of nutrition
 List of macronutrients
 List of micronutrients
 Outline of emergency medicine
 List of emergency medicine courses
 List of surgical procedures
 List of eye surgical procedures
 List of disabilities
 List of disability-related terms with negative connotations
 List of medical emergencies
 List of eponymous fractures
 List of AIDS-related topics
 List of clinically important bacteria
 List of distinct cell types in the adult human body
 List of eponymous medical signs
 List of life extension-related topics
 List of medical inhalants
 List of medical symptoms
 List of oncology-related terms
 List of oral health and dental topics
 List of pharmaceutical companies
 List of psychotherapies
 List of vaccine topics
 Outline of autism
 Outline of exercise
 Outline of obstetrics (pregnancy and childbirth)
 Outline of psychology
 Pharmacology, for list of medicinal substances

See also 

 Health
 Outline of health
 Outline of health sciences

External links 

 NLM (US National Library of Medicine, contains resources for patients and health care professionals)
 U.S. National Library of Medicine
 MedicineNet.com
 Science-Based Medicine – exploring issues and controversies in science and medicine.
 WebMD Health topics A-Z

Outline
Medicine
Medicine